Daytona 500 pole position winners for the NASCAR Cup Series's Daytona 500 are rewarded with being the driver to lead the field across the start line at the beginning of the 200-lap  race. Pole qualifying for the Daytona 500 is held one weekend before the race at the Daytona International Speedway. The first Daytona 500 was held in 1959 and in 1982, it became the opening event for the NASCAR Cup season. The term "pole position" was originally coined in the American horse racing industry, and indicated the position of the starter being next to the "poles", which established the boundaries of the course. The two drivers who complete a lap with the fastest time are awarded the first and second starting positions for the Daytona 500. An additional 33 to 35 entrants are determined by a combination of the results of two qualifying races and the position of the team in the previous season's point rankings. The remainder of the 43 car field consists of drivers who meet certain qualifications, such as qualifying speed or being one of the previous NASCAR champions.

From 1988 to 2018, NASCAR required teams to install a restrictor plate between the throttle body and the engine. This rule was enacted as an effort to slow the cars speed in response to an accident in which fans suffered minor injuries when Bobby Allison's car blew a tire and crashed at over  during a race at Talladega Superspeedway in 1987. Depending upon the sponsor, era, or a specific year, the qualifying races have been referred to as the "Duels" or the "Twins".

Procedure

The qualifying session for pole position is held before the Daytona 500.  Drivers take one timed lap to determine their time.  The fastest qualifier takes the pole position for the Daytona 500 and starts on the inside of the first row; the second fastest starts alongside him on the outside, referred to as the "outside pole." Both front row starters are locked into these starting positions.

The 2015 race used the standard knockout qualifying system.  Up to the 2014 race, drivers took two timed laps, and the better of the two timed laps was the driver's lap for purposes of Daytona 500 qualifying.  Until 2001, NASCAR offered a second (and at times, a third) round of qualifying for teams who wished to improve their qualifying times. Drivers and teams decided if they were content with their first attempt, and "stood on their time", or if they wanted to improve their chances by attempting a "second-round qualifying" attempt.  If satisfied with the original attempt, the team was required to notify NASCAR within five minutes of the final practice sessions, and before the beginning of the "second-round qualifying" attempts.  Drivers who made second-round attempts started behind first-round only drivers; however, the qualifying times were crucial, since it determined a driver's fall back time should he fail to finish in the top 14 of the qualifying races.  The strategy was usually done by drivers whose times would not make the race or be on the bubble. The second round of qualifying ended in 2001.

The two fastest drivers in the final qualifying session (the Daytona 500 pole winner and the "outside" pole winner) only are also awarded the pole positions for the two qualifying races held the following Thursday. Drivers are ranked by the furthest number of rounds advanced in qualifying, and then their qualifying time in the final round that they reached. Those who rank with an odd-numbered position are assigned to the first qualifying race, and those with an even-numbered rank to the second race. Cars in the final round of qualifying start the race in the front. The starting spots for the third through 32nd positions are determined by the drivers' finishing position in the qualifying races, with only the top 15 drivers' results, excluding the pole sitter in each race, advancing to the feature. From its inception in 1959 until 1967, it was 40 laps, and from 1969 to 2004 it was 50 laps. After the races, the top four drivers in speed of those that failed to advance through the qualifying race are positioned in positions 33–36. The speeds used for this does not reflect their official qualifying times; regardless of which qualifying round they reached, their time used is the fastest time set in any round (first, second, or third), and does not reflect their starting position in the Duels. Positions 37-42 will go to the top six teams (not drivers) in points from the previous year's owners (team) points standings of teams not already qualified, again with their positions based on speed, again based on the fastest time in any round, not in the final round that they reached. The final starting position in the Daytona 500 (43rd overall) is reserved by NASCAR to allow one former NASCAR champion to start the race under the "champion's provisional" rule. Also known as the "Petty Rule", this rule was established in 1989 when NASCAR's winningest driver (Richard Petty) failed to qualify for an event at Richmond International Raceway. If the Champion's Provisional is not necessary, the seventh-highest team in the previous year's points advances, and positions 37-43 are positioned based on speed from their fastest round of qualifying.

From 2005 until 2012, NASCAR adopted an "All Exempt Tour" format similar to golf.  The teams in the top 35 of owner points during the previous season would be eligible to run in the Daytona 500, regardless of qualifying speed. The qualifying races now determine the relative starting position for these 35 drivers plus the starting positions for an additional seven to eight teams. The top 35 drivers, plus two non-top 35 drivers from each qualifier, start in the first 39 positions of the 500. The 40th, 41st, and 42nd starting positions are given to the fastest three non-exempt cars based on qualifying speed, which have not already qualified. The 43rd starting position is awarded to the most recent previous NASCAR champion who attempted to qualify; it is given to the fastest car that hadn't qualified if all previous champions qualified into the field. In 2008, the qualifying competition became known as the "Coors Light Pole" when Coors replaced Budweiser as the primary sponsor. Budweiser's parent company, Anheuser Busch Corporation, had been sponsoring the race since 1979.

History

In early years, qualifying had varying formats: from one timed lap, to the average of two laps, to the better of two laps. The idea of having two individual races to establish the starting lineup of the Daytona 500 dates back to the first race in 1959. That event, advertised as "the 500 Mile NASCAR International Sweepstakes", featured cars from NASCAR's Grand National division racing against cars in the Convertible division. The first of the  qualifying races consisted of Convertible division cars and the second of Grand National cars. Shorty Rollins won the 100-mile Convertible race to become the track's first winner. When the green flag was thrown on the first Daytona 500, 59 cars raced to the starting line; the event was held without a caution period during the entire race. Prior to 1971, the qualifying races yielded points to the drivers' championship.

The  reduction in speed for the 1971 qualification was a result of NASCAR's effort to limit the increasing speeds achieved through the late 1960s and early 1970s. In an effort to reduce the escalating costs of developing faster racing equipment, increased horsepower, and the lack of parity in competition, NASCAR implemented several restrictions for the 1971 season, attempting to reduce speed by two methods. It experimented with restrictor plates for the first time at Michigan in August 1970. At the beginning of the 1971 season, NASCAR limited an engine's cubic inch displacement. The reductions had the effect of reducing costs for teams, but also limiting the horsepower and top speeds of NASCAR teams. At the time, NASCAR founder Bill France Sr. stated:

Corporate sponsors purchased naming rights to qualifying races; between 1982 and 1984, Uno cards was the title sponsor for the "Uno Twin 125's" qualifying events.  In 1985 they became known as "7-Eleven Twin 125's"; no sponsors funded the 1988 and 1989 qualifying events and the races were called "Daytona Twin Qualifiers". Gatorade became the sponsor of the dual qualifying events in 1991. In 2005, the event was increased , and became known as the "Gatorade Duels" until 2015. Starting in 2016 CanAm took over sponsorship of the races, where it stands today.

Since the restrictor plate era began in 1988 until 2014, qualifying was the better single lap of two; drivers are permitted one warm-up lap followed by two consecutive timed laps. Since restrictor plate cars require more time to accelerate to full speed, drivers often consider their first timed lap a "throwaway lap," and use it essentially as a second warm-up lap; and the second timed lap is usually the fastest of the three laps.

In August 2009, NASCAR announced that it would reschedule the 2010 opening round of qualifying to avoid a conflict with the NFL Super Bowl. The events that determine the top two starters for the Daytona 500 were rescheduled after the NFL moved the Super Bowl day one week to February 7, 2010. Qualifying had originally been scheduled for February 7, but NASCAR moved the date back to Saturday, February 6, to avoid conflict with the NFL. Daytona Speedway president, Robin Braig, stated:

In 2014, NASCAR adopted, starting with the second race of the year in Phoenix, a Formula One-style knockout qualifying system.  After tweaking it in the 2014 GEICO 500 at Talladega, the format became three five-minute rounds, with the first round being split as two five-minute rounds with half the field in each round.  As is the case for standard knockout qualifying, the top 24 advanced to the second round, and the top 12 advancing to the final round.  This format was used at the Daytona 500 for the first time in 2015, but was soon abandoned for restrictor plate races after a series of incidents taking place during qualifying.

Restrictor plate races eventually gets a new two-round qualifying format starting from the first Talladega race. In round 1, each car goes out one at a time for one warm-up, one timed, and one cool down lap. The order for the cars released was determined by a random draw. NASCAR will release the next car to begin their lap while the current car is finishing their timed lap with the goal to have the next car start their timed lap no more than 20 seconds after the previous car finishes. The top 12 cars from round 1 will make a second run in the same format to determine the starting lineup for positions 1–12, with the order of cars released are the invert of round 1 result (i.e. the 12th placed car will be released first). Positions 13th and below are determined by round 1 result.

Daytona 500 pole winners

Notes

 1959: Cotton Owens (143.198 mph) was the fastest qualifier.
 1960: Fireball Roberts (151.556 mph) was the fastest qualifier.
 1963: Johnny Rutherford (165.183 mph) was the fastest qualifier.
 1964: On April 4, 1959, Dick Rathmann set the one-lap Daytona International Speedway track qualifying record driving in a USAC Champ Car race at 173.210 mph. The Champ Cars would not return to the track. The one-lap record held until 1964 when Paul Goldsmith finally broke it in a NASCAR stock car with a speed of 174.910 mph.
 1969: David Pearson (190.029 mph) was the fastest qualifier.
 1976: A. J. Foyt (185.943 mph) was the fastest qualifier.
 1980: A. J. Foyt (195.020 mph) was the fastest qualifier again.
 1983: On his first of two qualifying laps, Cale Yarborough ran a lap of 200.503 mph, a new track record, and the first 200 mph lap (320 km/h) in Daytona history. On the second lap, however, gusty winds caused him to spin, flip over, and crash in turn 4. The car had to be withdrawn, and the lap did not count. Yarborough started a backup car on race day, and was moved to the rear of the field. Ricky Rudd was credited with the fastest qualifying speed at 198.864 mph.
 1990: Pole winner Ken Schrader crashed during the Gatorade Twin 125's, and was required to start a back-up car on race day. His car was moved to the rear of the field, and duel winner Geoff Bodine moved up to the pole position.
 2003:  Starting with the 2002 Subway 400 at Rockingham (the race after the 2002 Daytona 500), teams were not permitted to change engines during the race week.  For the Daytona 500, a team must race their qualifying race with the same engine they used to qualify.  An engine change between first qualifying practice and the qualifying race means the team must start in the back for that race only.  After the qualifying races, teams will be allowed one engine change before the start of the final Daytona 500 practices on the Saturday before the race.  The engine in the car for the Saturday practices before the Daytona 500 is the declared engine, with any engine change after the first Daytona 500 practice that occurs after the qualifying race will be penalized with the team being sent to the rear of the field.  As is the case for a backup car after a crash, the respective column of cars moves up when the offending car is moved to the back.  This is the first Daytona 500 with the new engine rule.
 2004: Greg Biffle won his first Nextel Cup Series pole but changed engines after final Daytona 500 practice the Saturday before the race.  This moved the inside column of cars up, and Dale Earnhardt Jr. started first and won the race.
 2011: Dale Earnhardt Jr. won the Coors Light Pole Award, but crashed in Wednesday practice.  Although a backup car was implemented and Earnhardt started in the rear for the first Duel, he also was moved to the rear for the Daytona 500 under an oddity in Daytona 500 qualifying rules.  Drivers who switch to backup cars after incidents in Wednesday practice do not have to move to the back for the Daytona 500 if the car raced in the Duel is the same car for the 500, unless it is one of the front row qualifying cars.  Kurt Busch, who won the first Duel, started first.
 2015: Starting with 2014 The Profit on CNBC 500 the next week at Phoenix, multiple-round knockout qualifying, used in many codes of motorsport, was implemented.  The knockout format was used for the first time at the Daytona 500, using the old restrictor plate qualifying format (three five-minute rounds, with the first round split evenly between cars, each having a five-minute round, top 24 advance to the second round, top 12 advancing to the final round).  Six drivers were faster than pole speed in Q1, and three drivers (including eventual pole winner Jeff Gordon) were faster than the pole speed in Q2.  The pole time was set in Q3.  Aric Almirola (44.473 seconds/) was the fastest qualifier, but the time was set in Q1; he finished 15th in Q2 (originally 17th, but moved up after two post-Q3 disqualifications) and did not advance to Q3.
 2016: Starting with the 2015 GEICO 500 at Talladega, one-lap single car qualifying was used on plate tracks.  After the round was completed, the top 12 cars advance to Q2, where the drivers take one more timed lap.  The two drivers with the fastest laps in Q2 start first and second, respectively, in the Daytona 500.

Statistics

Multiple Daytona 500 pole winners

 4 pole positions
 Buddy Baker (1969, 1973, 1979, 1980)
 Cale Yarborough (1968, 1970, 1978, 1984)
 Bill Elliott (1985, 1986, 1987, 2001)
 3 pole positions
 Fireball Roberts (1961, 1962, 1963)
 Ken Schrader (1988, 1989, 1990)
 Dale Jarrett (1995, 2000, 2005)
 Alex Bowman (2018, 2021, 2023)
 2 pole positions
 Donnie Allison (1975, 1977)
 Jimmie Johnson (2002, 2008)
 Jeff Gordon (1999, 2015)
 Chase Elliott (2016, 2017)

Consecutive Daytona 500 pole winners

 3 consecutive
 Fireball Roberts (1961–1963)
 Bill Elliott (1985–1987)
 Ken Schrader (1988–1990)
 2 consecutive
 Buddy Baker (1979–1980)
 Chase Elliott (2016–2017)

Family Daytona 500 pole winner combos
 Bobby Allison (1981), Donnie Allison (1975, 1977) (Brother of Bobby), and Davey Allison (1991) (Son of Bobby)
 Dale Earnhardt (1996) (Father) and Dale Earnhardt Jr. (2011) (Son)
 Richard Petty (1966) (Father) and Kyle Petty (1993) (Son)
 Bill Elliott (1985–87, 2001) (Father) and Chase Elliott (2016–2017) (Son)

Daytona 500 winners from pole position
 1962 - Fireball Roberts
 1966 - Richard Petty
 1968, 1984 - Cale Yarborough
 1980 - Buddy Baker
 1985, 1987 - Bill Elliott
 1999 - Jeff Gordon
 2000 - Dale Jarrett

Television broadcasts
The very first NASCAR races to ever be shown on television were broadcast by CBS.  In February 1960, CBS sent a "skeleton" production crew to Daytona Beach, Florida and the Daytona International Speedway to cover the Daytona 500's Twin 100 qualifying races on February 12, 1960.  The production crew also stayed to broadcast portions of the Daytona 500 itself, two days later.  The event was hosted by John S. Palmer.  CBS would continue to broadcast portions of races for the next 18 years, along with ABC and NBC.

See also
 Daytona 500
 Gatorade Duels

References

Florida sports-related lists
Lists of NASCAR drivers
NASCAR races at Daytona International Speedway